Streptomyces deserti is a bacterium species from the genus of Streptomyces which has been isolated from hyper-arid desert soil.

See also 
 List of Streptomyces species

References

Further reading

External links
Type strain of Streptomyces deserti at BacDive -  the Bacterial Diversity Metadatabase

deserti
Bacteria described in 2013